Sébastien Schuller (born 26 August 1970) is a French singer, songwriter and film score composer living in Philadelphia. His film scores include Toi et Moi , Notre univers impitoyable, Un Jour d'Été, One O One, High Society,The Night Eats the World .

Discography

 1999: Londres (EP, Warner Music France)
 2002: Weeping Willow (EP, EMI Music France/Capitol Records)
 2005: Happiness (LP, Catalogue Records/Wagram Music)
 2005: Harmony (EP, Catalogue Records/Wagram Music)
 2009: Evenfall (LP, PIAS France)
 2014: Heat Wave (LP, self-produced)
 2023: Introspection (LP, self-produced)

External links
 
 
 
 

English-language singers from France
French film score composers
French male film score composers
French singer-songwriters
People from Yvelines
Living people
1970 births
21st-century French singers
21st-century French male singers
French male singer-songwriters